Senator Chance may refer to:

Genie Chance (1927–1998), Alaska State Senate
Ronnie Chance (born 1968), Georgia State Senate